During the 1958–59 Scottish football season, Celtic competed in Scottish Division One.

Results

Scottish Division One

Scottish Cup

Scottish League Cup

References

Celtic F.C. seasons
Celtic